Vincent A. Biancucci (September 24, 1940 – November 24, 2018) was a Democratic member of the Pennsylvania House of Representatives for the 15th District and was elected in 2002.

He was defeated for re-election in the 2008 general election. He died in 2018.

References

External links
Pennsylvania House of Representatives - Vince Biancucci. Official PA House website (archived)
Pennsylvania House Democratic Caucus - Representative Vince Biancucci. Official Party website (archived)
Vince Biancucci for State Representative. Campaign website
Biography, voting record, and interest group ratings at Project Vote Smart
Follow the Money - Vince Biancucci: 2006 2004 2002 campaign contributions

1940 births
2018 deaths
Democratic Party members of the Pennsylvania House of Representatives
People from Aliquippa, Pennsylvania